Anna Biryukova (born 27 September 1967 in Yekaterinburg, Sverdlovsk) is a retired female triple jumper from Russia.

In 1993 Biryukova won a gold medal at the World Championships by jumping 15.09 metres, a new world record. She reportedly believed she had the capability of jumping 16 metres, but in 1994 she didn't reach the 15 metre mark once, although she did become European champion that season. In 1995 she starred in the World Championships, and she almost reached old heights by jumping 15.08 metres. Women's triple jump had progressed, however, and she only managed a bronze medal behind Iva Prandzheva (15.15m) and Inessa Kravets, who jumped a world record of 15.50 metres up to Yulimar Rojas at 15.67m, the world record, was set during the 2020 Summer Olympics in Tokyo, Japan on August 1, 2021.

Anna Biryukova also competed in long jump from time to time, and her personal best is 6.64 metres.

International competitions

See also
List of World Athletics Championships medalists (women)
List of European Athletics Championships medalists (women)
List of European Athletics Indoor Championships medalists (women)
List of people from Yekaterinburg

References

1967 births
Living people
Sportspeople from Yekaterinburg
Russian female triple jumpers
Russian female long jumpers
Olympic female triple jumpers
Olympic athletes of Russia
Athletes (track and field) at the 1996 Summer Olympics
Competitors at the 1994 Goodwill Games
Goodwill Games medalists in athletics
World Athletics Championships athletes for Russia
World Athletics Championships medalists
World Athletics Championships winners
IAAF Continental Cup winners
European Athletics Championships winners
European Athletics Championships medalists
Russian Athletics Championships winners